Chiloglanis marlieri is a species of upside-down catfish endemic to the Democratic Republic of the Congo where it occurs in the Ndakirwa River. This species grows to a length of  TL.

References

External links 

marlieri
Freshwater fish of Africa
Fish of the Democratic Republic of the Congo
Endemic fauna of the Democratic Republic of the Congo
Fish described in 1952